Finasteride, sold under the brand names Proscar and Propecia among others, is a medication used to treat hair loss and benign prostatic hyperplasia (BPH) in men. It can also be used to treat excessive hair growth in women. It is taken by mouth.

Finasteride is a 5α-reductase inhibitor and therefore an antiandrogen. It works by decreasing the production of dihydrotestosterone (DHT) by about 70%, including in the prostate gland and the scalp.

In addition to DHT, finasteride also inhibits the production of several anticonvulsant neurosteroids including allopregnanolone, androstanediol, and THDOC.

Adverse effects from finasteride are rare; however, some men experience sexual dysfunction, depression, and breast enlargement. In some men, sexual dysfunction may persist after stopping the medication. It may also hide the early symptoms of certain forms of prostate cancer.

Finasteride was patented in 1984 and approved for medical use in 1992. It is available as a generic medication. In 2020, it was the 90th-most commonly prescribed medication in the United States, with more than 8million prescriptions.

Medical uses
Finasteride has been used for the treatment of symptomatic benign prostatic hyperplasia (BPH) in men with an enlarged prostate and for the treatment of male pattern hair loss (androgenetic alopecia) in men.

Enlarged prostate
Physicians sometimes prescribe finasteride for the treatment of benign prostatic hyperplasia (BPH), informally known as an enlarged prostate. Finasteride may improve the symptoms associated with BPH such as difficulty urinating, getting up during the night to urinate, hesitation at the start and end of urination, and decreased urinary flow.

The use of the drug showed significant sexual adverse effects such as erectile dysfunction and less sexual desire, in particular when obstructive symptoms due to an enlarged prostate were present.

Scalp hair loss
Finasteride is also used to treat male pattern baldness (androgenic alopecia) in men, a condition that develops in up to 80% of Caucasian men. In the United States, finasteride and minoxidil are the only two FDA approved drugs for the treatment of male pattern hair loss as of 2017. Treatment with finasteride slows further hair loss and provides about 30% improvement in hair loss after six months of treatment, with effectiveness persisting as long as the drug is taken. Taking finasteride leads to a reduction in scalp and serum DHT levels; by lowering scalp levels of DHT, finasteride can maintain or increase the amount of terminal hairs in the anagen phase by inhibiting and sometimes reversing miniaturization of the hair follicle. Finasteride is most effective on the crown but can reduce hair loss in all areas of the scalp. Finasteride has also been tested for pattern hair loss in women; however, the results were no better than placebo. Finasteride is less effective in the treatment of scalp hair loss than dutasteride.

Prostate cancer
In males over 55 years old finasteride decreases the risk of low-grade prostate cancer but may increase the risk of high-grade prostate cancer and has no effect on overall survival.

A 2010 review found a 25% reduction in the risk of prostate cancer with 5α-reductase inhibitor. A follow-up study of the Medicare claims of participants in a 10-year Prostate Cancer Prevention Trial suggests the reduction in prostate cancer is maintained even after discontinuation of treatment. However, 5α-reductase inhibitors have been found to increase the risk of developing certain rare but aggressive forms of prostate cancer (27% risk increase), although not all studies have observed this. No impact of 5-α-reductase inhibitor on survival has been found in people with prostate cancer.

Excessive hair growth
Finasteride has been found to be effective in the treatment of hirsutism (excessive facial and/or body hair growth) in women. In a study of 89 women with hyperandrogenism due to persistent adrenarche syndrome, finasteride produced a 93% reduction in facial hirsutism and a 73% reduction bodily hirsutism after 2 years of treatment. Other studies using finasteride for hirsutism have also found it to be clearly effective.

Transgender hormone therapy
Finasteride is sometimes used in hormone replacement therapy for transgender women due to its antiandrogenic effects, in combination with a form of estrogen. However, little clinical research of finasteride use for this purpose has been conducted and evidence of safety or efficacy is limited. Moreover, caution has been recommended when prescribing finasteride to transgender women, as finasteride may be associated with side effects such as depression, anxiety, and suicidal ideation, symptoms that are particularly prevalent in the transgender population and in others at high risk already.

Adverse effects

A 2010 Cochrane review of finasteride for BPH found that, in men with a weighted mean age of 62.4, adverse effects are "rare; nevertheless, men taking finasteride are at increased risk for impotence, erectile dysfunction, decreased libido, and ejaculation disorder, versus placebo."  fresh evidence suggested such effects, along with disturbed neurosteroid production, may persist after finasteride use is stopped.

Finasteride is contraindicated in pregnancy. The Food and Drug Administration advises that donation of blood or plasma be deferred for at least one month after taking the last dose of finasteride.

The FDA has added a warning to 5α-reductase inhibitors concerning an increased risk of high-grade prostate cancer, as the treatment of BPH lowers PSA (prostate-specific antigen), which could mask the development of prostate cancer. Although overall incidence of male breast cancer in clinical trials for finasteride 5 mg was not increased, there are post-marketing reports of breast cancer in association with its use, though available evidence does not provide clarity as to whether there is a causative relationship between finasteride and these cancers. A 2018 meta-analysis found no higher risk of breast cancer with 5α-reductase inhibitors. Some men develop gynecomastia (breast development or enlargement) following finasteride usage. The risk of gynecomastia with 5α-reductase inhibitors is low at about 1.5%. Depressive symptoms and suicidality have been reported.

Sexual adverse effects
Use of finasteride is associated with an increased risk of sexual dysfunction including erectile dysfunction, decreased libido and ejaculatory dysfunction. Sexual adverse effects of finasteride and dutasteride have been linked to lower quality of life and ability to maintain an intimate relationship, and can cause stress in relationships.

The adverse effect profiles of finasteride are somewhat different for its indications of hair loss and BPH.

Finasteride for androgenetic alopecia (hair loss in men)
The most common adverse effects of finasteride taken for hair loss are: decrease in sex drive, erectile dysfunction and decrease in amount of semen.

In addition, finasteride has been reported in case reports to cause sexual problems which persist after stopping the medication. A 2012 update to the FDA label noted reports of decreased sex drive, problems with ejaculation and difficulty achieving an erection which continued after stopping the medication. The update also referenced reports of testicular pain and "male infertility and/or poor quality of semen."

Finasteride for BPH
The most common adverse sexual effects of finasteride for BPH are: trouble getting or keeping an erection, decrease in sex drive, decreased volume of ejaculate and ejaculation disorders.

A 2010 Cochrane review found that men taking finasteride for BPH (with a mean age of 62.4) are at increased risk for impotence, erectile dysfunction, decreased libido, and ejaculation disorder for the first year of treatment. The rates became indistinguishable from placebo after 2–4 years and these side effects usually got better over time.

Long-term
Finasteride may cause persistent adverse sexual, neurological and physical effects in a subset of men. A 2019 metastudy surveyed the literature on the reversibility of finasteride's side effects. It identified three studies which demonstrated full reversibility of side effects and eleven that describe patients with irreversible adverse events. The findings were most convincing in a retrospective review of about 12,000 patients that 1.4% of the cohort developed persistent ED (ED lasting longer than 90 days post-withdrawal).

Post-finasteride syndrome 
Men in the U.S. and Canada concerned about persistent sexual side effects "coined the phrase 'post-finasteride syndrome', which they say is characterized by sexual, neurological, hormonal and psychological side effects that can persist in men who have taken finasteride for hair loss or an enlarged prostate". As of 2016, Merck was a defendant in approximately 1,370 product liability lawsuits which had been filed by customers alleging they have experienced persistent sexual side effects following cessation of treatment with finasteride.

A 2019 editorial in The BMJ called post-finasteride syndrome "ill defined and controversial". Some have argued that it has common features with other self-diagnosed "mystery syndromes" such as Morgellons or multiple chemical sensitivity, while others argue "that finasteride and dutasteride induce a constellation of persistent sexual, neurological and physical adverse side effects, in a subset of men" which "constitute the basis for PFS". There is no known underlying biological mechanism for the proposed syndrome, and its incidence is also unclear. A lack of clear diagnostic criteria and the variable reporting fraction in different health-care settings make the problem challenging to evaluate.

Self-reported symptoms of post-finasteride syndrome include penile atrophy and tissue changes, decreased ejaculate volume and quality, libido loss, erectile dysfunction, loss of penile sensitivity, decreased orgasm sensation, dry skin, metabolic changes, muscle and strength loss, gynecomastia, depression, anxiety, panic attacks, insomnia, anhedonia, concentration problems, memory impairment and suicidal ideation. A meta-analysis found significant association between finasteride use and post-discontinuation depression, suicide ideation, and sexual dysfunction, but the quality of evidence was limited.

Plaintiffs have filed over one thousand court cases against Merck over the effects of finasteride. Most were settled by 2018 when Merck paid a lump sum of US$4.3 million to be distributed. , 25 cases remained outstanding in the United States.

In 2019 Reuters reported that faulty redactions in court documents revealed allegations from plaintiffs that Merck had known of persistent side effects in their original clinical trials but chose not to disclose them in warning labels.

Overdose
Finasteride has been studied in humans at single doses of up to 400 mg and at continuous dosages of up to 80 mg/day for three months, without adverse effects observed. There is no specific recommended antidote for finasteride overdose.

Interactions
No significant drug interactions have been observed between finasteride and a limited selection of medications.

Pharmacology

Pharmacodynamics
Finasteride is a 5α-reductase inhibitor. It is specifically a selective inhibitor of the type II and III isoforms of the enzyme. By inhibiting these two isozymes of 5α-reductase, finasteride reduces the formation of the potent androgen dihydrotestosterone (DHT) from its precursor testosterone in certain tissues in the body such as the prostate gland, skin, and hair follicles. As such, finasteride is a type of antiandrogen, or more specifically, an androgen synthesis inhibitor. However, some authors do not define finasteride as an "antiandrogen," a term which can refer more specifically to antagonists of the androgen receptor.

Finasteride results in a decrease of circulating DHT levels by about 65–70% with an oral dosage of 5 mg/day and of DHT levels in the prostate gland by up to 80–90% with an oral dosage of 1 or 5 mg/day. In parallel, circulating levels of testosterone increase by approximately 10%, while local concentrations of testosterone in the prostate gland increase by about 7-fold and local testosterone levels in hair follicles increase by around 27–53%. An oral dosage of finasteride of only 0.2 mg/day has been found to achieve near-maximal suppression of DHT levels (68.6% for 0.2 mg/day relative to 72.2% for 5 mg/day). Finasteride does not completely suppress DHT production because it lacks significant inhibitory effects on the 5α-reductase type I isoenzyme, with more than 100-fold less inhibitory potency for type I as compared to type II ( = 313 nM and 11 nM, respectively). This is in contrast to inhibitors of all three isoenzymes of 5α-reductase like dutasteride, which can reduce DHT levels in the entire body by more than 99%. In addition to inhibiting 5α-reductase, finasteride has also been found to competitively inhibit 5β-reductase (AKR1D1). However, its affinity for the enzyme is substantially less than for 5α-reductase (an order of magnitude less than for 5α-reductase type I) and hence is unlikely to be of clinical significance.

As of 2012, the tissues in which the different isozymes of 5α-reductase are expressed are not fully clear. This is because different investigators have obtained varying results with different reagents, methods, and tissues examined. However, the different isozymes of 5α-reductase appear to be widely expressed, with notable tissues including the prostate gland, seminal vesicles, testes, epididymides, skin, hair follicles, liver, kidneys, and brain, among others.

By inhibiting 5α-reductase and thus preventing DHT production, finasteride reduces androgen signaling in tissues like the prostate gland and the scalp. In the prostate, this reduces prostate volume, which improves BPH and reduces risk of prostate cancer. Finasteride reduces prostate volume by 20 to 30% in men with benign prostatic hyperplasia. Inhibition of 5α-reductase also reduces epididymal weight, and decreases motility and normal morphology of spermatozoa in the epididymis.

Neurosteroids like 3α-androstanediol (derived from DHT) and allopregnanolone (derived from progesterone) activate the GABAA receptor in the brain; because finasteride prevents the formation of neurosteroids, it functions as a neurosteroidogenesis inhibitor and may contribute to a reduction of GABAA activity. Reduction of GABAA receptor activation by these neurosteroids has been implicated in depression, anxiety, and sexual dysfunction.

In accordance with finasteride being a potent 5α-reductase inhibitor but a weak inhibitor of 5β-reductase, the medication decreases circulating levels of 5α-reduced steroids like allopregnanolone but does not reduce concentrations of 5β-reduced steroids like pregnanolone. Pregnanolone acts as a potent GABAA receptor positive allosteric modulator similarly to allopregnanolone.

Pharmacokinetics
The mean oral bioavailability of finasteride is approximately 65%. The absorption of finasteride is not affected by food. At steady-state with 1 mg/day finasteride, mean peak concentrations of finasteride were 9.2 ng/mL (25 nmol/L). Conversely, following a single 5 mg dose of finasteride, mean peak levels of finasteride were 37 ng/mL (99 nmol/L), and plasma concentrations increased by 47–54% following 2.5 weeks of continued daily administration. The volume of distribution of finasteride is 76 L. Its plasma protein binding is 90%. The drug has been found to cross the blood–brain barrier, whereas levels in semen were found to be undetectable.

Finasteride is extensively metabolized in the liver, first by hydroxylation via CYP3A4 and then by aldehyde dehydrogenase. It has two major metabolites, which are the tert-butyl side chain monohydroxylated and monocarboxylic acid metabolites. These metabolites show approximately 20% of the inhibitory activity of finasteride on 5α-reductase. Hence, the metabolites of finasteride are not particularly active. The drug has a terminal half-life of 5 to 6 hours in adult men (18–60 years of age) and a terminal half-life of 8 hours or more in elderly men (more than 70 years of age). It is eliminated as its metabolites 57% in the feces and 40% in the urine.

Chemistry

Finasteride, also known as 17β-(N-tert-butylcarbamoyl)-4-aza-5α-androst-1-en-3-one, is a synthetic androstane steroid and 4-azasteroid. It is an analogue of androgen steroid hormones like testosterone and DHT. As an unconjugated steroid, finasteride is a highly lipophilic compound.

History
In 1942, James Hamilton observed that prepubertal castration prevents the later development of male pattern baldness in mature men. In 1974, Julianne Imperato-McGinley of Cornell Medical College in New York attended a conference on birth defects. She reported on a group of intersex children in the Caribbean who appeared sexually ambiguous at birth, and were initially raised as girls, but then grew external male genitalia and other masculine characteristic after onset of puberty. These children, despite being raised as girls until puberty, were generally heterosexual, and were termed "Guevedoces" by their local community, which means "penis at twelve" in Spanish. Her research group found these children shared a genetic mutation, causing deficiency of the 5α-reductase enzyme and male hormone dihydrotestosterone (DHT), which was found to have been the etiology behind abnormalities in male sexual development. Upon maturation, these individuals were observed to have smaller prostates which were underdeveloped, and were also observed to lack incidence of male pattern baldness.

In 1975, copies of Imperato-McGinley's presentation were seen by P. Roy Vagelos, who was then serving as Merck's basic-research chief. He was intrigued by the notion that decreased levels of DHT led to the development of smaller prostates. Dr. Vagelos then sought to create a drug which could mimic the condition found in these children to treat older men who had  benign prostatic hyperplasia.

Finasteride was developed by Merck under the code name MK-906.  A team led by chemist Gary Rasmusson and biologist Jerry Brooks developed potential 5α-reductase inhibitors based on transition state inhibitors, using an iterative process of molecular design, testing, and redesign.  In 1992, finasteride (5 mg) was approved by the U.S. Food and Drug Administration (FDA) for treatment of BPH, which Merck marketed under the brand name Proscar. Rasmusson and Brooks were awarded IPO's "Inventor of the Year" award in 1993 for their work on finasteride.  In 1997, Merck was successful in obtaining FDA approval for a second indication of finasteride (1 mg) for treatment of male pattern hair loss, which was marketed under the brand name Propecia. It was the first 5α-reductase inhibitor to be introduced and was followed by dutasteride in 2001. The first study of finasteride in the treatment of hirsutism in women was published in 1994.

Society and culture

Generic names
It is also known by its former developmental code names MK-906, YM-152, and L-652,931.

Brand names
Finasteride is marketed primarily under the brand names Propecia, for pattern hair loss, and Proscar, for BPH, both of which are products of Merck & Co. There is 1 mg of finasteride in Propecia and 5 mg in Proscar. Merck's patent on finasteride for the treatment of BPH expired in June 2006. Merck was awarded a separate patent for the use of finasteride to treat pattern hair loss and it expired in November 2013. Finasteride is also marketed under a variety of other brand names throughout the world.

Athletics
From 2005 to 2009, the World Anti-Doping Agency banned finasteride because it was discovered that the drug could be used to mask steroid abuse. It was removed from the list effective 1 January 2009, after improvements in testing methods made the ban unnecessary. Athletes who used finasteride and were banned from international competition include skeleton racer Zach Lund, bobsledder Sebastien Gattuso, footballer Romário, and ice hockey goaltender José Théodore.

Miscellaneous
The U.S. Food and Drug Administration advises that donation of blood or plasma be deferred for at least one month after taking the last dose of finasteride. The UK also has a one-month deferral period.

Harold Bornstein, the former personal physician of United States President Donald Trump, stated in 2017 that Trump was taking finasteride to promote hair growth.

Research
Preliminary research suggests that topical finasteride may be effective in the treatment of pattern hair loss. Topical finasteride, like the oral preparation, reduces serum DHT.

DHT may be involved in the cause of acne, and 5α-reductase inhibitors might be effective in the treatment of the condition. A small retrospective study reported that finasteride was effective in the treatment of acne in women with normal testosterone levels. A randomized controlled trial found that finasteride was less effective than flutamide or an ethinylestradiol/cyproterone acetate birth control pill in the treatment of acne in women with high androgen levels.

Androgens and estrogens may be involved in the cause of hidradenitis suppurativa (acne inversa). Two case series have reported that finasteride is effective in the treatment of hidradenitis suppurativa in girls and women.

Finasteride and other antiandrogens might be useful in the treatment of obsessive–compulsive disorder, but more research is needed.

References

External links
 

Wikipedia medicine articles ready to translate
5α-Reductase inhibitors
Androstanes
Merck & Co. brands
Carboxamides
Hair loss medications
Hair removal
Delta-lactams
Teratogens
Tert-butyl compounds